Herad Church may refer to: 

Herad Church (Buskerud), a church in Gol municipality in Buskerud county, Norway
Herad Church (Vest-Agder), a church in Farsund municipality in Vest-Agder county, Norway